Mr. Monk on the Road is the eleventh novel written by Lee Goldberg to be based on the television series Monk. It was published on January 4, 2011. Like the other Monk novels, the story is narrated by Natalie Teeger, Monk's assistant.

Plot summary
After solving a suicide turned homicide case, and feeling balanced after solving the murder of his wife Trudy, Adrian Monk wants his agoraphobic brother, Ambrose to experience life as well.   With the help of Natalie, Julie, and Molly, Ambrose's birthday cake is drugged with sleeping pills and Ambrose is dragged into a motor home.  When Ambrose wakes up, he finds himself on the open road with Adrian determined to show him the outside world.  They meet several eclectic people, including a reporter named Dub Clemens who is determined to find a killer before he dies of lung cancer, and his tattooed assistant Yuki.  Unfortunately for Natalie and Ambrose, their road trip is postponed several times when Adrian Monk is tasked with helping to solve various murders.

Mr. Monk and the Seventeen Steps
Mr. Monk and the Seventeen Steps is an excerpt from Mr. Monk on the Road that was published in the December 2010 issue of Ellery Queen's Mystery Magazine before the release of the book.  In the story, Monk is called upon to investigate an apparent suicide, and is disturbed by the fact that the walkway to the deceased's home has an odd number of steps.

List of characters

Characters from the television series
 Adrian Monk: the titular detective, played on the series by Tony Shalhoub
 Natalie Teeger: Monk's loyal assistant and the narrator of the book, played on the series by Traylor Howard
 Julie Teeger: Natalie's daughter, played on the series by Emmy Clarke
 Ambrose Monk: Monk's agoraphobic brother, played on the series by John Turturro
 Leland Stottlemeyer: Head of the SFPD; Monk's and Natalie's boss and friend, played on the series by Ted Levine
 Molly Evans: Trudy's biological daughter and Monk's step-daughter, played on the series by Alona Tal

Original characters
 Dub Clemens: An aging reporter who is dying of lung cancer, and is searching for the identity of a killer he has been tracking for years.
 Yuki Nakamura: Dub's assistant, who travels with him in his RV.

References

2011 American novels
Monk (novel series)
Signet Books books